Nilam may refer to:

Cyclone Nilam, a strong tropical cyclone that affected South India in 2012
Nilam K.C. (Khadka), Nepalese politician
Nilam (film), a 1949 Malaysian film

See also
 Neelam (disambiguation)